John Frith (born 24 April 1985 in Roma, Queensland) is an Australian professional rugby league footballer for the North Queensland Cowboys in the National Rugby League (NRL) competition.

Statistics

Club career

References

External links
Player Details at cowboys.com.au

1985 births
Living people
Australian rugby league players
North Queensland Cowboys players
People from Roma, Queensland
Rugby league players from Queensland
Rugby league props